The Technological Educational Institute of Ionian Islands (TEI ION) was a fully self-governing higher-educational institute under state supervision, exercised by the Minister of National Education and Religious Affairs. The institute was based in Argostoli on the island of Kefalonia, with satellite campuses in Lixouri, Lefkada and Zakynthos. The Technological Educational Institute offered also postgraduate courses in collaboration with other universities in Greece and abroad. In 2018 the TEI of Ionian Islands merged into Ionian University.

History
The Ionian Islands have a long tradition in education. The Ionian Academy was the first university of modern Greece. In 1908 Panayis Athanase Vagliano donated the Agricultural School of Argostoli and in 1915 the Vallianos Vocational School in Lixouri. In 2003 these two schools and some others in the Ionian Islands were unified to the new TEI of the Ionian Islands.

Schools and departments
The university comprises four Schools and six Departments.

The ATHENA Reform Plan restructured the institute's departments in 2013.

The language of instruction at the TEI of Ionian Islands is Greek. Therefore, a good knowledge of Greek is essential for regular students. However, special arrangements are made for certain number of courses for Erasmus students who wish to follow regular courses. Additionally, a few courses are taught in English and there are plans for some more.

Academic evaluation
In 2016 the external evaluation committee gave TEI of Ionian Islands a Positive evaluation.

An external evaluation of all academic departments in Greek universities was conducted by the Hellenic Quality Assurance and Accreditation Agency (HQA).

See also 
 Ionian Academy, the first Greek academic institution established in modern times (1824).
 University of Ioannina, a university located in Epirus, established in 1970.
 Ionian University, a university located in Corfu, established in 1984.
 List of research institutes in Greece
 List of universities in Greece
 Academic grading in Greece
 Education in Greece
 Ionian Islands

References

External links 
 TEI of Ionian Islands - Official Webpage 
 Hellenic Quality Assurance and Accreditation Agency (HQA) 
 TEI of Ionian Islands - Internal Quality Assurance Unit   
 TEI of Ionian Islands - LLP/ERASMUS Office 
 "ATHENA" Plan for Higher Education  
 Greek Research and Technology Network (GRNET)  
 Hellenic Academic Libraries Link (HEAL-Link) 
 okeanos (GRNET's cloud service) 

Argostoli
Ionian Islands
2003 establishments in Greece
Educational institutions established in 2003
Transport in the Ionian Islands (region)